Calvin Amandus Neeman (February 18, 1929 – October 1, 2015) was an American professional baseball player who played catcher in the Major Leagues from 1957 to 1963 for the Chicago Cubs, Philadelphia Phillies, Pittsburgh Pirates, Cleveland Indians and Washington Senators. He was an alumnus of Illinois Wesleyan University, where he played both baseball and basketball.

Newman entered baseball in 1949 after being signed to a New York Yankees' contract by scout Lou Maguolo. He spent six seasons in the Bombers' farm system (missing 1951–52 while performing United States Army service in the Korean War) until his selection by the Cubs in the 1956 Rule 5 draft.

He collected a career-high 107 hits and 39 runs batted in, hitting .258 with ten home runs. The next year, Neeman hit a career-best 12 homers in only 76 games played, and batted .259.

In 376 games played in the majors, Neeman had 224 hits, including 35 doubles, ten triples, 30 home runs and 97 runs batted in. He hit .224 lifetime.

Neeman died on October 1, 2015, at his home in Lake St. Louis, Missouri. He was 86.

References

External links

Retrosheet
Venezuelan Professional Baseball League

1929 births
2015 deaths
American expatriate baseball players in Venezuela
Atlanta Crackers players
Baseball players from Illinois
Binghamton Triplets players
Birmingham Barons players
Buffalo Bisons (minor league) players
Chicago Cubs players
Cleveland Indians players
Columbus Jets players
Denver Bears players
Illinois Wesleyan University alumni
Illinois Wesleyan Titans baseball players
Jacksonville Suns players
Joplin Miners players
Leones del Caracas players
Major League Baseball catchers
People from Lake St. Louis, Missouri
People from Monroe County, Illinois
Philadelphia Phillies players
Pittsburgh Pirates players
Richmond Virginians (minor league) players
Tulsa Oilers (baseball) players
United States Army personnel of the Korean War
United States Army soldiers
Washington Senators (1961–1971) players